Reid Sinnett (born February 5, 1997) is an American football quarterback for the San Antonio Brahmas of the XFL. He played college football at San Diego.

Early life and high school
Sinnett grew up in Johnston, Iowa and attended Johnston High School. As a senior, his only year as a starter, he passed for 2,202 yards and 16 touchdowns. Lightly recruited out of high school, Sinnett originally had an offer from Penn before a change in the coaching staff. He eventually decided to enroll at San Diego at the recommendation from a former Penn coach that he contact the team's offensive coordinator, Tanner Engstrand. He also received preferred walk-ons from Kansas, Harvard, Iowa State, Rhode Island, and Yale.

College career
Sinnett redshirted his true freshman season. He spent the next three seasons as the backup to Anthony Lawrence, who became the all-time leading passer in Pioneer Football League history, and passed for a total of 316 yards with one touchdown pass on 24-of-48 passes during that span. Sinnett was named the Toreros starter going into his redshirt senior season. In his only season as a starter, Sinnett completed 66.9 percent of his passes for 3,528 yards, 32 touchdowns and 10 interceptions while rushing for 174 yards and six touchdowns and was named first-team All-PFL and a finalist for the Walter Payton Award. Following the end of his collegiate career Sinnett played in the NFLPA Collegiate Bowl and completed 9 of 16 passes for 93 yards in the game.

Professional career

Tampa Bay Buccaneers
Sinnett signed a contract that included $152,000 in guaranteed money with the Tampa Bay Buccaneers as an undrafted free agent on April 25, 2020. He was waived by the team during final roster cuts on September 5, 2020, and subsequently signed with the practice squad the next day. He was released on September 8, 2020.

Miami Dolphins
Sinnett was signed to the Miami Dolphins practice squad on September 14, 2020. He was elevated to the active roster on November 28 and January 2, 2021, for the team's weeks 12 and 17 games against the New York Jets and Buffalo Bills, and reverted to the practice squad after each game. He signed a reserve/future contract with the Dolphins on January 5, 2021.

On August 31, 2021, Sinnett was waived by the Dolphins and re-signed to the practice squad the next day. He was promoted to the active roster on September 25, 2021 after an injury to starter Tua Tagovailoa. He was waived on October 23.

Philadelphia Eagles
Sinnett was claimed off waivers by the Philadelphia Eagles on October 25, 2021. He did not appear in any games for the Eagles in 2021.

On August 30, 2022, Sinnett was waived by the Eagles and signed to the practice squad the next day. He was released on September 7.

Miami Dolphins (second stint)
Sinnett was re-signed to the Miami Dolphins practice squad on October 3, 2022 and was released on November 1, 2022.

San Antonio Brahmas
On November 18, 2022, Sinnett was assigned to the San Antonio Brahmas of the XFL.

References

External links
San Diego Toreros bio

Living people
1997 births
People from Johnston, Iowa
Players of American football from Iowa
American football quarterbacks
San Diego Toreros football players
Tampa Bay Buccaneers players
Miami Dolphins players
Philadelphia Eagles players
San Antonio Brahmas players